The Moscow Pavilion (former expo67 Pavilion) was designed as an exhibition pavilion for the Soviet Union at the international exhibition Expo 67 in Montreal, Quebec, Canada. Since the 1990s, the pavilion has been commonly called the Moscow Pavilion.

References

External links 

  Moscow Pavilion in the VDNKh website

Exhibition of Achievements of National Economy
Buildings and structures in Moscow
Buildings and structures completed in 1968
Modernist architecture in Russia
International Style (architecture)
Tourist attractions in Moscow
Expo 67
World's fair architecture in Montreal
World's fair architecture in Moscow
Cultural heritage monuments in Moscow